The 2014 Badminton Asia Junior Championships is an Asia continental junior championships to crown the best U-19 badminton players across Asia. It was held in Taipei, Taiwan from February 16 to February 23, 2014. This is the second time for this event has been held in Taipei after being hosted by the city in 2001. This year, over 250 top badminton players from more than 20 different countries participated in the competition.

Tournament
The 2014 Badminton Asia Junior Championships organized by the Chinese Taipei Badminton Association and Badminton Asia Confederation. This tournament consists of mixed team competition, which was held from  16 – 19 February , as well as the five individual events started from 19–23 February.

Venue
This tournament was held at Taipei Gymnasium.

Medalists
In the mixed team event, China defend their title by swept South Korea 3–0 in the final. Japan and Chinese Taipei team finished in the semi finals. In the individuals event, China secured four titles, by winning the boys' singles, boys' doubles, girls' doubles and mixed doubles. The girls' singles title goes to Japanese player.

Medal table

See also
 List of sporting events in Taiwan

References

External links 
Team Event at Tournamentsoftware.com
Individual Event at Tournamentsoftware.com

 
Badminton Asia Junior Championships
Asian Junior Badminton Championships
Asian Junior Badminton Championships
International sports competitions hosted by Taiwan
2014 in Taiwanese sport
2014 in youth sport